Rúyì (如意 "as desired") may refer to:

Ruyi Bridge, a bridge in Taizhou, Zhejiang, China
Ruyi (scepter), ceremonial Buddhist scepter or a talisman
Ruyi Jingu Bang, the weapon of the hero Sun Wukong in Journey to the West
Ruyi Island, off the coast of Haikou, Hainan
Ruyi Lake, near Chengde, Hebei
Ruyi, Shaoshan, a town in Shaoshan city, Hunan
Ruyi's Royal Love in the Palace, a 2018 Chinese drama.

See also
Liu Ruyi (208–195 BC), prince of the Chinese Han Dynasty